During most of the 20th century photography depended mainly upon the photochemical technology of silver halide emulsions on glass plates or roll film. Early in the 21st century this technology was displaced by the electronic technology of digital cameras. The development of digital image sensors, microprocessors, memory cards, miniaturised devices and image editing software enabled these cameras to offer their users a much wider range of operating options than was possible with the older silver halide technology. This has led to a proliferation of new abbreviations, acronyms and initialisms. The commonest of these are listed below. Some are used in related fields of optics and electronics but many are specific to digital photography.

Acronyms and initialisms that are not brand-specific

Initialisms that are used mainly by specific brands

References

General references
 Blair, John G. The Glossary of Digital Photography. Rocky Nook, 2007, .
 Peres, Michael R. The Focal Encyclopedia of Photography, Fourth Edition. Focal, 2007, .
 Taylor, Phil. Digital Photographic Imaging Glossary. Trafford, 2006, .
 Glossary, issued by Nikon, explaining the Nikkor lens codes. Retrieved 2011-01-01.

Photography